Gasteranthus is a genus of 35 species of herbs and soft-stemmed subshrubs in the flowering plant family Gesneriaceae. The species occur in Central America and South America, from southernmost Mexico to Bolivia. Numerous species are threatened with extinction, mainly due to deforestation. This is due to two reasons: For one thing, Gasteranthus species are native to countries in which destruction of primary forest runs rampant; also, these plants do not distribute well and therefore endemism is very frequent, for example on isolated mountain ranges.

These plants inhabit tropical forest and cloud forest. They grow in humid, shaded locations at altitudes of up to 1,800 m ASL. The flowers are usually colored in orange hues and often spotted, but background colors also include shades white, yellow and red. They are born in axillary cymes without bracteoles.

Gasteranthus was previously included in the closely related genus Besleria.  The two genera have been separated on the basis of differences in their stomata (aggregated in Gasteranthus, scattered in Besleria) and fruits (fleshy capsule in Gasteranthus, berry in Besleria). Characteristic are the whitish dots on the leaf undersides caused by aggregations of stomata in Gasteranthus.

Two main groups can be distinguished in this genus: one group of species, with white to yellow, bell- or tube-shaped flowers, is probably pollinated mainly by euglossine bees.  The other group has bright orange or red hypocyrtoid (inflated corolla tube with very small opening) flowers and are apparently pollinated mainly by hummingbirds.

Selected species
 Gasteranthus atratus
 Gasteranthus bilsaensis
 Gasteranthus carinatus
 Gasteranthus corallinus
 Gasteranthus crispus
 Gasteranthus delphinioides
 Gasteranthus extinctus
 Gasteranthus imbaburensis
 Gasteranthus lateralis
 Gasteranthus macrocalyx
 Gasteranthus mutabilis
 Gasteranthus orientandinus
 Gasteranthus otongensis
 Gasteranthus perennis
 Gasteranthus quitensis
 Gasteranthus tenellus
 Gasteranthus ternatus
 Gasteranthus timidus
 Gasteranthus trifoliatus
 Gasteranthus wendlandianus

Footnotes

References
  (1991): Biological extinction in western Ecuador. Ann. MO Bot. Gard. 78(2): 273–295.
  (2000): Revision of Gasteranthus (Gesneriaceae). Systematic Botany Monographs 59: 1–118.
  (2007): Gasteranthus. In: The genera of Gesneriaceae. Basic information with illustration of selected species (2nd ed.). Version of 2007-JAN-05. Retrieved 2007-SEP-20.
  (1975): Besleria L. and the re-establishment of Gasteranthus Benth. (Gesneriaceae). Selbyana 1(2): 150–156.

 
Gesneriaceae genera